The Sir Robert Ho Tung Library is a public library in São Lourenço, Macau, China. A part of the Macao Public Library system, is located in St. Augustine's Square in the Historic Centre of Macau, a UNESCO World Heritage Site. The library is housed in a mansion that has good historical, cultural and architectural value. The old building has the head office of the library system, located on the ground floor, and the offices of the Macao ISBN Agency, located on the second floor.

History
The building was constructed before 1894 and was owned by Dona Carolina Cunha. Later the mansion was purchased by Hong Kong businessman Sir Robert Ho Tung in 1918 as a retreat and he lived there between 1941 and 1945 during the Japanese occupation of Hong Kong as the Japanese respected Portuguese neutrality in Macau. He died in 1955 and the building was presented to the Government for conversion to a public library in accordance with his will.

Sir Robert Ho Tung Library was officially opened in 1958 to the general public. In 2005, a new building was constructed near the back garden of the mansion, making the library the biggest public library in Macau.

See also
 List of oldest buildings and structures in Macau

References

1958 establishments in Macau
Historic Centre of Macau
Houses completed in 1894
Libraries established in 1958
Public libraries in China
Tourist attractions in Macau
Libraries in Macau
Portuguese colonial architecture in China